The lavta is a plucked string music instrument from Istanbul.

Description
The Lavta has a small body made of many ribs made using carvel bending technique. Its appearance is somewhat like a small (Turkish) oud - the strings are made from gut like an oud but it has only 7 strings in 4 courses and is tuned E AA dd gg  (like the oud), or sometimes A dd aa d'd' (in intervals of 5ths like laouto - as well as 4ths); it is also sometimes tuned to Turkish Bolahenk tuning C G D A, which is the same as G D A E in concert pitch. 
The adjustable frets are made from tied bits of gut on the fingerboard, at the microtonal intervals of the makam system. This is more closely related to instruments like tanbur than to the fretless oud and the 12-frets of the octave laouto.
The bridge usually has mustache-shaped ends. The fingerboard is flush with the soundboard, is often unvarnished, and has a carved and inlaid rosette. Some lavta have a pegbox like the oud (angling down), others more like a guitar (or like a bouzouki or a Greek laouto). The tuning pegs are shaped like those of the violin, with 3 on the right side and 4 on the left side of the open tuning head.

History

Known as a lavuta (լավութա) in Armenian, also occasionally called Politiko Laouto (Lute from Constantinople) in Greek, is an instrument that was popular in the early 20th century, particularly among the Greek and Armenian communities of Istanbul, but also the Turkish community, it was one of the many instruments played by noted Turk Tanburi Cemil Bey. It was gradually replaced by the oud and survived until this day. From the 1980s there has been a revival of interest in this instrument, and now It is possibile  to find the lavta again both in Turkey and in Greece.

Right hand technique is similar to an oud, with a long thin plectrum.

See also

 Laouto
 Rud
 Shahrud
 Kobza
 Nautilauta

Sources
http://www.atlasofpluckedinstruments.com/middle_east.htm

Greek music
Persian music
Turkish music
Armenian musical instruments
Turkish musical instruments
Turkish inventions
Instruments of Ottoman classical music
Instruments of Turkish makam music
Plucked string instruments